Ron Pasco (born February 3, 1972) is a Canadian professional ice hockey coach and a former professional ice hockey player. He is currently serving as an assistant coach at Swiss National League team Lausanne HC.

Playing career 
Pasco attended Rensselaer Polytechnic Institute where he played NCAA Division I ice hockey with the RPI Engineers.

He turned professional with the 1994–95 season, initially suiting up with the Greensboro Monarchs of the ECHL, before transferring to the Tallahassee Tiger Sharks. He played the following year (1995–96) with IHL's Utah Grizzlies and then spent the 1996–97 season with the Canada men's national ice hockey team, before pursuing his professional career in Europe.

Pasco played for Adler Mannheim, Kassel Huskies, Kölner Haie, Schwenninger Wild Wings of Germany, Villacher SV and ATSE Graz of Austria, Danish side Rødovre and IF Troja-Ljungby of during his 13-year career in Europe.

In Germany, he won three Deutsche Eishockey Liga championships with Adler Mannheim.

Coaching career 
He began his career behind the bench in the youth ranks of German team Kölner Haie and was appointed as assistant coach of the club's Deutsche Eishockey Liga squad in May 2014. Only some months later, in October, the entire Haie coaching staff, including Pasco, was relieved of its duties.

On February 18, 2016, he was named assistant coach of German DEL team Adler Mannheim and stayed in that job until the end of the 2015-16 season. On July 5, 2016, he was added to the coaching staff of KHL side HC Dinamo Minsk, just like in Mannheim serving as an assistant to Craig Woodcroft. He stayed in Minsk until the end of the 2016-17 season.

On February 8, 2018, Pasco was named assistant coach of Swiss National League team Lausanne HC.

On January 21, 2020, it was announced that Pasco was named head coach of Lithuania men's national team after Daniel Lacroix joined the Moncton Wildcats of the Quebec Major Junior Hockey League (QMJHL).

Awards and honors

References

External links

1972 births
Living people
Adler Mannheim players
ATSE Graz players
Canadian ice hockey centres
EC VSV players
Greensboro Monarchs players
Ice hockey people from Ottawa
Kassel Huskies players
Kölner Haie players
Lithuania men's national ice hockey team coaches
Rødovre Mighty Bulls players
RPI Engineers men's ice hockey players
Schwenninger Wild Wings players
Tallahassee Tiger Sharks players
IF Troja/Ljungby players
Utah Grizzlies (IHL) players
Ice hockey coaches
Canadian expatriate sportspeople in Belarus
Canadian expatriate ice hockey players in Austria
Canadian expatriate ice hockey players in Denmark
Canadian expatriate ice hockey players in Germany
Canadian expatriate ice hockey players in the United States